A prisoner of war is a person, whether combatant or non-combatant, who is held in custody by an enemy power during or immediately after an armed conflict.

Prisoner of War may also refer to:
 Prisoner of War (film), a 1954 film
 Prisoners of War (TV series) or Hatufim, a 2010 Israeli TV series
 "Prisoner of War" (Falling Skies), a 2011 episode of Falling Skies
 Prisoner of War (video game), a 2002 video game
 Prisoners of War (Homeland), the series finale of the American TV series Homeland
 P.O.W.: Prisoners of War, a 1988 arcade game that was ported to the NES console

See also 
 Merry Christmas, Mr. Lawrence or Furyo, a 1983 British-Japanese film known
 POW (disambiguation)